War of Words is the debut album by the American heavy metal band Fight, released on September 14, 1993 by Epic Records. This is the first release Rob Halford recorded after his departure from Judas Priest in 1992. He brought with him drummer Scott Travis from the band and recruited three new members. The music is a mixture between the heavy metal sound created by Judas Priest and a thrash/groove metal sound similar to that of Pantera. Halford is also credited with playing guitar but only recorded vocals for the album. Music videos were made for "Nailed to the Gun", "Immortal Sin" and "Little Crazy".

Reception 

In 2005, War of Words was ranked number 386 in Rock Hard magazine's book The 500 Greatest Rock & Metal Albums of All Time.

Track listing

Note
 "Reality, a New Beginning" is a 4:40 song, which is followed by a 5 minute silence. At the 9:43 mark, a hidden song titled "Jesus Saves" is played

Personnel 
Fight
 Rob Halford – vocals, guitar
 Brian Tilse – guitars, keyboards, backing vocals
 Russ Parrish – guitars, keyboards, backing vocals
 Jay Jay – bass, backing vocals
 Scott Travis – drums, percussion, backing vocals

Production
 Produced by Attie Bauw and Rob Halford
 Executive producer – John Baxter
 Recorded by Attie Bauw

2008 Remixed and Remastered Edition
Remixed by Roy Z
Remastered by Andy Horn
Art design – Marc Sasso

Charts

References

1993 debut albums
Epic Records albums
Fight (band) albums